Abdoulaye Ousmane (Arabic: عبد الله عثمان; born 22 February 2000) is a professional footballer who plays as a defender for French club Lille reserve team. Born in France, he represents Mauritania at international level.

Club career 
Ousmane made his professional debut for Strasbourg in a 2–0 Coupe de France loss to Montpellier on 10 February 2021. 

In early February 2022, Ousmane joined Greek club Apollon Larissa on a contract until June 2023. However, he left the club in July.

Ousmane then joined French side Lille reserve team on 22 September 2022.

International career 
Born in France, Ousmane is of Mauritanian descent. He made his debut for Mauritania national team on 26 March 2021 in an AFCON 2021 qualifier against Morocco.

References

External links 
 
 

2000 births
Living people
Mauritanian footballers
Mauritania international footballers
French footballers
French sportspeople of Mauritanian descent
Association football defenders
Valenciennes FC players
RC Strasbourg Alsace players
Apollon Larissa F.C. players
Championnat National 3 players
French expatriate footballers
Mauritanian expatriate footballers
Expatriate footballers in Greece
French expatriate sportspeople in Greece
Mauritanian expatriate sportspeople in Greece
People from Maubeuge
Footballers from Hauts-de-France
Sportspeople from Nord (French department)